The 2011 Qantas industrial disputes were a series of disputes between the Australian airline Qantas and a number of trade unions during much of 2011 and the start of 2012. The disputes commenced in late 2010, when Qantas and unions commenced bargaining for new enterprise agreements. The bargaining became more heated when the airline announced its intentions to launch a new airline in Asia. During the bargaining, engineers, pilots and baggage handlers carried out a number of protected industrial actions, culminating in the decision by Qantas, on 29 October 2011, to lock out those employees (with the consequence that the entire Qantas mainline fleet would be grounded). After an application by the Federal Minister for Workplace Relations, Fair Work Australia terminated the industrial action with effect from 2 am on 31 October 2011.

Background
In mid-2011, Qantas and the Transport Workers Union of Australia (TWU) went into industrial bargaining, where TWU employees demanded that the airline guarantee further improvements in working conditions and better wages. In the nine months leading up to October, 200 meetings related to industrial bargaining were held. Industrial action by unions caused disruptions and delays to Qantas' flight schedule which cost the airline A$68 million.

On 10 July 2011, long-haul pilots who were members of the Australian and International Pilots Association (AIPA) voted to take protected industrial action against the airline, for the first time since 1966. The president of AIPA, Barry M. Jackson, said "The issue that pushed us towards taking protected industrial action is a fundamental one – keeping Qantas pilots operating Qantas flights. We now have a management team in charge who believe you can shift operations to Asia, outsource the jobs of Australian Qantas pilots and not do any damage to the Qantas brand in the process."

Announcement of new strategy 
On 16 August 2011, Qantas announced plans to launch a new airline in Asia and move away from the North Atlantic which had been the airline's traditional market. The airline said that it would establish Jetstar Japan as a low-cost carrier, along with a premium carrier to be based at either Singapore or Kuala Lumpur. At the same time the airline announced there would be 1,000 job losses. These plans are expected to increase the market share of Qantas by making it more competitive. Australian Council of Trade Unions secretary Jeff Lawrence described the day as the "darkest" in the airline's history.

Grounding and employee lock-out 

At a press conference on 29 October 2011, CEO Alan Joyce announced the immediate—and unprecedented—grounding of all Australian domestic and international Qantas flights, effective 5pm AEDT, as a result of the proposed lock-out of the airline's staff, beginning at 8 pm AEDT on 31 October, in response to continued industrial action against the company. Joyce said that Qantas subsidiaries Jetstar Airways, QantasLink and Jetconnect would not be affected by the grounding, along with Express Freighters Australia and Atlas Air freight aircraft (operating on behalf of Qantas Freight and Australian airExpress).

Qantas said it would reimburse accommodation costs for those left stranded by the fleet grounding, and refund those who were expected to fly with the airline.

Impact and response
Following the abrupt announcement of the suspension of operations, all Qantas aircraft already on the ground, regardless of whether they were in maintenance or serviceable, were grounded, and all passengers who had boarded aircraft were instructed to disembark and collect their baggage. Multiple reports suggested that some aircraft turned around during taxiing for take-off. Flights that were in the air at the time of the announcement continued to their next destinations and were then grounded. The lock-out was expected to affect 68,000 to 80,000 passengers in the first day, to result in the cancellation of 600 flights and to cost the airline in excess of $20 million each day. Bookings of 17 heads of state attending the Commonwealth Heads of Government Meeting in Perth were also affected.

The grounding was expected to cause disastrous consequences to the Australian economy. Australian Senator Nick Xenophon criticised the action as "militant management". TWU secretary Tony Sheldon labelled the move by Qantas as "a pre-conceived, pre-planned attempt to hoodwink the shareholders, hoodwink the Australian community. Now it's trying to hoodwink the company's workforce". Tony Abbott, then Leader of the Opposition, blamed the disputes on the government decision not to intervene, and said that the grounding was avoidable.

Then Prime Minister, Julia Gillard, requested an urgent meeting at a Fair Work Australia tribunal: "As a result of the dramatic escalation of that dispute the government has taken a rare decision to make an application to Fair Work Australia to have the industrial action terminated and have Fair Work Australia deal with this dispute". A hearing was held in Melbourne at 10 pm on 29 October. Richard Woodward, vice-president of the AIPA, said, "Alan Joyce is holding a knife to the nation's throat".

Despite the barrage of criticism, a newspaper has published claims that the grounding was backed by the flight attendants' union.

Qantas' rival airlines responded positively to the fleet grounding. Virgin Australia offered stranded passengers a discount on flight fares. Virgin also announced that it would provide an additional 43,000 seats in the coming weeks to accommodate Qantas passengers. Air New Zealand were sluggish, but after several requests agreed to cover Virgin and Qantas' trans-Tasman flights, to free up New Zealand based aircraft and crews for Virgin to use in the Australian domestic market. AirAsia X offered discounted fares for passengers holding a valid Qantas ticket to any AirAsia X destination.

According to Qantas, the industrial action by the three labour unions cost the airline A$194 million (US$195 million).

Fair Work Australia orders 
In the early hours of 31 October, a full bench of Fair Work Australia handed down orders that all industrial action taken by Qantas and the involved trade unions be terminated immediately. The order was requested by the federal government amid fears that an extended period of grounding would do significant damage to the national economy, especially with regards to the tourism and mining sectors. The government elected not to use its powers under Section 431 of the Fair Work Act 2009, which enabled a minister to unilaterally make a declaration to terminate industrial action. On 8 August 2012 Fair Work Australia rejected key union pay and contract-worker restriction demands. The unions had flagged the possibility of more disruptions.

References

External links 
 What is the Qantas dispute all about? ABC News, 29 October 2011
 Rolling coverage: Qantas grounds fleet  News.com.au
 Prime Minister moves to end Qantas grounding The Australian, 30 October 2011
 Editorial: Qantas faces turbulence Adelaide Now, 29 October 2011
Fair Work Act 2009  Fair Work Australia

Qantas
Unions
Qantas trade union disputes
Qantas trade union disputes
Qantas trade union disputes
Aviation strikes
Qantas